Orville Alton Thompson "Tommy" Turnquest, CBE (born 16 November 1959) is a Bahamian politician.

Education and career
Turnquest was born in 1959 in Nassau. He is the son of Sir Orville Turnquest, a former Governor-General, and Lady Edith Turnquest.

He attended St Anne's High School in Nassau and Malvern College in England. He was also enrolled in the University of Western Ontario in Canada. He has worked at the Canadian Imperial Bank of Commerce. During his banking career, he was the manager of the East Bay Street Branch until the general election in August 1992.

Turnquest began his political career in 1981. He was instrumental in the reactivation of the Torchbearers, the youth wing of the Free National Movement (FNM) where he served as president for four years. On 19 August 1992, he was elected the MP for Mount Moriah and then re-elected in the 1997 general elections. He has held many positions in the FNM, including Parliamentary Secretary for the Prime Minister's Office, Minister of State for Public Service and Labor, Minister of State for Public Works and Minister for Tourism. He was appointed Minister of Public Works on 20 March 1997. After being voted leader-elect at a FNM party convention in August 2001, he looked likely to succeed Hubert Ingraham as the next Prime Minister of the Bahamas. However, at the general election held on 2 May 2002, Turnquest lost his constituency seat to Keod Smith, the Progressive Liberal Party (PLP) candidate. He continued to serve as leader of the FNM until 10 November 2005 and as Leader of the Opposition in the Senate until the 2007 general election, when he won back the seat of Mount Moriah, serving under Prime Minister Ingraham. He was sworn in as the Minister of National Security by Governor-General Arthur D. Hanna on 4 May 2007.

Turnquest again lost his seat, this time to Arnold Forbes, the PLP candidate, in the 2012 general election held on 7 May 2012.

References

External links
 Official website of Tommy Turnquest and the Mount Moriah FNM Headquarters
 Mount Moriah Constituency at the official website of Free National Movement

1959 births
Living people
Commanders of the Order of the British Empire
Free National Movement politicians
Members of the House of Assembly of the Bahamas
Members of the Senate of the Bahamas
University of Western Ontario alumni
People educated at Malvern College
Children of national leaders
Government ministers of the Bahamas
Justice ministers of the Bahamas